The San Remo Cafe was a bar at 93 MacDougal Street at the corner of Bleecker Street in the New York City neighborhood of Greenwich Village. It was a hangout for Bohemians and writers such as James Agee, W. H. Auden, Tennessee Williams, James Baldwin, William S. Burroughs, Gregory Corso, Miles Davis, Allen Ginsberg, Billy Name, Frank O'Hara, Jack Kerouac, Jackson Pollock, William Styron, Dylan Thomas, Gore Vidal, Judith Malina, and many others. It opened in 1925 and closed in 1967.

Jack Kerouac described the bar's crowd in his novel The Subterraneans:

On July 29, 2013, the Greenwich Village Society for Historic Preservation unveiled a plaque at 93 MacDougal Street to commemorate the cafe's rich 42-year lifespan. Musician David Amram, who used to hang out at the San Remo, spoke at the event.

References

Drinking establishments in Greenwich Village
1925 establishments in New York City
1967 disestablishments in New York (state)
Defunct drinking establishments in Manhattan